Clendon is both a surname and a given name. Notable people with the name include:

David Clendon (born 1955), New Zealand politician
James Reddy Clendon (1800–1872), early European settler in New Zealand
Clendon Thomas (born 1935), American football player

See also
Clendon Park, a suburb of Auckland, New Zealand